Robert Lamar Rensberger (March 7, 1921 – September 6, 2007) was an American professional basketball player. He played one season for the Chicago Stags of the Basketball Association of America (BAA) in 1946–47. He only appeared in three total games, shot 0-for-7 in total field goal attempts, scored zero career points and ended up with four personal fouls.

A native of Nappanee, Indiana, Rensberger attended Nappanee High School and graduated in 1939. He then enrolled at the University of Notre Dame and played for the men's basketball team from 1940–41 to 1942–43. As a senior, Rensberger averaged 9.3 points per game (ppg) after posting 6.7 ppg the year before, and he was named a consensus Second Team All-American at the end of his final season.

During the middle of his senior year, Fighting Irish head coach George Keogan suffered a heart attack and died. Rensberger and his teammates served as the pallbearers for Keogan's funeral on the afternoon of February 20, 1943, before playing a game that same night.

BAA career statistics

Regular season

References

1921 births
2007 deaths
All-American college men's basketball players
American men's basketball players
Basketball players from Indiana
Chicago American Gears players
Chicago Stags players
Forwards (basketball)
Guards (basketball)
Notre Dame Fighting Irish men's basketball players
People from Nappanee, Indiana